Golina may refer to the following places in Poland:
Golina, a town in Greater Poland Voivodeship (central Poland)
Golina, Lower Silesian Voivodeship (south-west Poland)
Golina, Jarocin County in Greater Poland Voivodeship (west-central Poland)
Golina, Drawsko County in West Pomeranian Voivodeship (north-west Poland)
Golina, Stargard County in West Pomeranian Voivodeship (north-west Poland)